The 1996–97 Czech Cup was the fourth season of the annual football knock-out tournament of the Czech Republic. Winners Slavia Prague qualified for the 1997–98 UEFA Cup Winners' Cup.

Preliminary round

Round 1

Round 2

Round 3
Matches were played on 28 August 1996.

|}

Round 4
The fourth round was played on 15 and 16 April 1997.

|}

Quarterfinals
The quarterfinals were played on 29 and 30 April, and 7 May 1997.

|}

Semifinals
The semifinals were played on 13 and 14 May 1997.

|}

Final

See also
 1996–97 Czech First League
 1996–97 Czech 2. Liga

References

External links
 Official site 
 Czech Cup 1996/97 at RSSSF.com

1996–97
1996–97 domestic association football cups
Cup